Below is the list of populated places in Bitlis Province, Turkey by the districts. In the following lists first place in each list is the administrative center of the district.

Bitlis
 Bitlis		
 Ağaçdere, Bitlis		
 Ağaçköprü, Bitlis		
 Ağaçpınar, Bitlis		
 Akçalı, Bitlis		
 Alaniçi, Bitlis		
 Arıdağ, Bitlis		
 Aşağıbalcılar, Bitlis		
 Aşağıkaraboy, Bitlis		
 Aşağıölek, Bitlis		
 Aşağıyolak, Bitlis		
 Ayrancılar, Bitlis		
 Başhan, Bitlis		
 Başmaklı, Bitlis		
 Bayramalan, Bitlis		
 Beşkaynak, Bitlis		
 Bölükyazı, Bitlis		
 Cevizdalı, Bitlis		
 Cumhuriyet, Bitlis		
 Çalıdüzü, Bitlis		
 Çayırbaşı, Bitlis		
 Çeltikli, Bitlis		
 Çobansuyu, Bitlis		
 Değirmenaltı, Bitlis		
 Deliktaş, Bitlis		
 Dereağzı, Bitlis		
 Dikme, Bitlis		
 Direktaşı, Bitlis		
 Doğruyol, Bitlis		
 Dörtağaç, Bitlis		
 Döşkaya, Bitlis		
 Ekinli, Bitlis		
 Geçitbaşı, Bitlis		
 Ilıcak, Bitlis		
 İçgeçit, Bitlis		
 İçmeli, Bitlis		
 Karbastı, Bitlis		
 Karınca, Bitlis		
 Kavakdibi, Bitlis		
 Kayabaşı, Bitlis		
 Kayadağ, Bitlis		
 Kayalıbağ, Bitlis		
 Keklikdüzü, Bitlis		
 Kınalı, Bitlis		
 Kireçtaşı, Bitlis		
 Kokarsu, Bitlis		
 Konalga, Bitlis		
 Konuksayar, Bitlis		
 Koruk, Bitlis		
 Kömüryakan, Bitlis		
 Küllüce, Bitlis		
 Narlıdere, Bitlis		
 Ortakapı, Bitlis		
 Sarıkonak, Bitlis		
 Sarpkaya, Bitlis		
 Tabanözü, Bitlis		
 Tanrıyar, Bitlis		
 Tatlıkaynak, Bitlis		
 Uçankuş, Bitlis		
 Üçevler, Bitlis		
 Ünaldı, Bitlis		
 Yanlızçamlar, Bitlis		
 Yarönü, Bitlis		
 Yayalar, Bitlis		
 Yaygın, Bitlis		
 Yeşilsırt, Bitlis		
 Yolağzı, Bitlis		
 Yolalan, Bitlis		
 Yolcular, Bitlis		
 Yolyazı, Bitlis		
 Yukarıbalcılar, Bitlis		
 Yukarıkaraboy, Bitlis		
 Yukarıölek, Bitlis		
 Yukarıyolak, Bitlis		
 Yumurtatepe, Bitlis		
 Yuvacık, Bitlis		
 Yücebaş, Bitlis

Adilcevaz
 Adilcevaz		
 Akçıra, Adilcevaz		
 Akyazı, Adilcevaz		
 Aşağısüphan, Adilcevaz		
 Aydınlar, Adilcevaz		
 Aygırgölü, Adilcevaz		
 Bahçedere, Adilcevaz		
 Cihangir, Adilcevaz		
 Çanakyayla, Adilcevaz		
 Danacı, Adilcevaz		
 Dizdar, Adilcevaz		
 Erikbağı, Adilcevaz		
 Esenkıyı, Adilcevaz		
 Göldüzü, Adilcevaz		
 Gölüstü, Adilcevaz		
 Gümüşdüven, Adilcevaz		
 Harmantepe, Adilcevaz		
 Heybeli, Adilcevaz		
 İpekçayır, Adilcevaz		
 Karakol, Adilcevaz		
 Karaşeyh, Adilcevaz		
 Karşıyaka, Adilcevaz		
 Kavuştuk, Adilcevaz		
 Kömürlü, Adilcevaz		
 Mollafadıl, Adilcevaz		
 Örentaş, Adilcevaz		
 Yarımada, Adilcevaz		
 Yıldızköy, Adilcevaz		
 Yolçatı, Adilcevaz		
 Yukarısüphan, Adilcevaz

Ahlat
 Ahlat		
 Akçaören, Ahlat		
 Alakır, Ahlat		
 Bahçe, Ahlat		
 Burcukaya, Ahlat		
 Cemalettin, Ahlat		
 Çatalağzı, Ahlat		
 Çukurtarla, Ahlat		
 Develik, Ahlat		
 Dilburnu, Ahlat		
 Gölgören, Ahlat		
 Güzelsu, Ahlat		
 Kınalıkoç, Ahlat		
 Kırıkkaya, Ahlat		
 Kırkdönüm, Ahlat		
 Kuşhane, Ahlat		
 Nazik, Ahlat		
 Otluyazı, Ahlat		
 Ovakışla, Ahlat		
 Saka, Ahlat		
 Serinbayır, Ahlat		
 Seyrantepe, Ahlat		
 Soğanlı, Ahlat		
 Taşharman, Ahlat		
 Uludere, Ahlat		
 Yeniköprü, Ahlat		
 Yoğurtyemez, Ahlat		
 Yuvadamı, Ahlat

Güroymak
 Güroymak
 Arpacık, Güroymak		
 Aşağıkolbaşı, Güroymak		
 Budaklı, Güroymak		
 Cevizyatağı, Güroymak		
 Çallı, Güroymak		
 Çayarası, Güroymak		
 Çıtak, Güroymak		
 Değirmen, Güroymak		
 Gedikpınar, Güroymak		
 Gölbaşı, Güroymak		
 Günkırı		
 Güzelli, Güroymak		
 Kaleli, Güroymak		
 Kavunlu, Güroymak		
 Kekliktepe, Güroymak		
 Kuştaşı, Güroymak		
 Oduncular, Güroymak		
 Özkavak, Güroymak		
 Saklı, Güroymak		
 Sütderesi, Güroymak		
 Tahtalı, Güroymak		
 Taşüstü, Güroymak		
 Üzümveren, Güroymak		
 Yamaçköy, Güroymak		
 Yayladere, Güroymak		
 Yazıkonak, Güroymak		
 Yemişveren, Güroymak		
 Yukarıkolbaşı, Güroymak

Hizan
 Hizan		
 Ağılözü, Hizan		
 Akbıyık, Hizan		
 Akça, Hizan		
 Akçevre, Hizan		
 Akdik, Hizan		
 Akşar, Hizan		
 Aladana, Hizan		
 Ballı, Hizan		
 Ballıca, Hizan		
 Bozpınar, Hizan		
 Bölüklü, Hizan		
 Budaklı, Hizan		
 Çalışkanlar, Hizan		
 Çatakdeğirmen, Hizan		
 Çayır, Hizan		
 Çökekyazı, Hizan		
 Dayılar, Hizan		
 Derince, Hizan		
 Doğancı, Hizan		
 Döküktaş, Hizan		
 Ekinli, Hizan		
 Ekintepe, Hizan		
 Elmacık, Hizan		
 Erencik, Hizan		
 Esenler, Hizan		
 Gayda, Hizan		
 Gökay, Hizan		
 Göktepe, Hizan		
 Gönüllü, Hizan		
 Gürece, Hizan		
 Hacımehmet, Hizan		
 Harmandöven, Hizan		
 Horozdere, Hizan		
 İçlikaval, Hizan		
 İncirli, Hizan		
 Kalkanlı, Hizan		
 Kapısuyu, Hizan		
 Karaağaç, Hizan		
 Karbastı, Hizan		
 Karlıtepe, Hizan		
 Kayalı, Hizan		
 Keçeli, Hizan		
 Keklik, Hizan		
 Koçlu, Hizan		
 Koçyiğit, Hizan		
 Kolludere, Hizan		
 Meydan, Hizan		
 Nurs, Hizan		
 Oğlaklı, Hizan		
 Ortaca, Hizan		
 Oymapınar, Hizan		
 Örgülü, Hizan		
 Sağınlı, Hizan		
 Sağırkaya, Hizan		
 Sarıtaş, Hizan		
 Sarpkaya, Hizan		
 Soğuksu, Hizan		
 Sürücüler, Hizan		
 Süttaşı, Hizan		
 Şehir, Hizan		
 Tutumlu, Hizan		
 Uzuntaş, Hizan		
 Ürünveren, Hizan		
 Yaylacık, Hizan		
 Yelkıran, Hizan		
 Yenicik, Hizan		
 Yığınkaya, Hizan		
 Yoğurtlu, Hizan		
 Yolbilen, Hizan		
 Yukarıayvacık, Hizan		
 Yukarıçalı, Hizan

Mutki
 Mutki		
 Açıkalan, Mutki		
 Akçaağaç, Mutki		
 Akıncı, Mutki		
 Akpınar, Mutki		
 Alatoprak, Mutki		
 Alıcık, Mutki		
 Alkoyun, Mutki		
 Aydemir, Mutki		
 Bağarası, Mutki		
 Ballı, Mutki		
 Beşevler, Mutki		
 Boğazönü, Mutki		
 Bozburun, Mutki		
 Çatalerik, Mutki		
 Çatalsöğüt, Mutki		
 Çaygeçit, Mutki		
 Çayırlı, Mutki		
 Çığır, Mutki		
 Çiğdemalan, Mutki		
 Çitliyol, Mutki		
 Dağarcık, Mutki		
 Dağlık, Mutki		
 Dereyolu, Mutki		
 Ekizler, Mutki		
 Erler, Mutki		
 Geyikpınar, Mutki		
 Göztepe, Mutki		
 Gümüşkanat, Mutki		
 İkizler, Mutki		
 Kapaklı, Mutki		
 Kapıkaya, Mutki		
 Karabudak, Mutki		
 Kaşak, Mutki		
 Kaşıklı, Mutki		
 Kavakbaşı, Mutki		
 Kayabaşı, Mutki		
 Kayran, Mutki		
 Kocainiş, Mutki		
 Kovanlı, Mutki		
 Koyunlu, Mutki		
 Kuşdili, Mutki		
 Küllüce, Mutki		
 Meydan, Mutki		
 Oluklu, Mutki		
 Özenli, Mutki		
 Salman, Mutki		
 Sarıçiçek, Mutki		
 Sekiliyazı, Mutki		
 Taşboğaz, Mutki		
 Tolgalı, Mutki		
 Uran, Mutki		
 Uzunyar, Mutki		
 Üçadım, Mutki		
 Üstyayla, Mutki		
 Yalıntaş, Mutki		
 Yanıkçakır, Mutki		
 Yazıcık, Mutki		
 Yenidoğan, Mutki		
 Yeniköy, Mutki		
 Yumrumeşe, Mutki		
 Yuvalıdam, Mutki

Tatvan
 Tatvan		
 Adabağ, Tatvan		
 Alacabük, Tatvan		
 Anadere, Tatvan		
 Benekli, Tatvan		
 Bolalan, Tatvan		
 Budaklı, Tatvan		
 Çalıdüzü, Tatvan		
 Çanakdüzü, Tatvan		
 Çavuşlar, Tatvan		
 Çekmece, Tatvan		
 Çevre, Tatvan		
 Dağdibi, Tatvan		
 Dalda, Tatvan		
 Dibekli, Tatvan		
 Dönertaş, Tatvan		
 Düzcealan, Tatvan		
 Eğritaş, Tatvan		
 Göllü, Tatvan		
 Güntepe, Tatvan		
 Güreşçi, Tatvan		
 Hanelmalı, Tatvan		
 Harmanlı, Tatvan		
 Kağanlı, Tatvan		
 Kaynarca, Tatvan		
 Kırkbulak, Tatvan		
 Kısıklı, Tatvan		
 Kıyıdüzü, Tatvan		
 Kolbaşı, Tatvan		
 Koruklu, Tatvan		
 Koyluca, Tatvan		
 Koyunpınarı, Tatvan		
 Köprücük, Tatvan		
 Kuruyaka, Tatvan		
 Kuşluca, Tatvan		
 Küçüksu, Tatvan		
 Nohutlu, Tatvan		
 Obuz, Tatvan		
 Odabaşı, Tatvan		
 Örenlik, Tatvan		
 Sallıca, Tatvan		
 Sarıdal, Tatvan		
 Sarıkum, Tatvan		
 Söğütlü, Tatvan		
 Suboyu, Tatvan		
 Teknecik, Tatvan		
 Tokaçlı, Tatvan		
 Topraklı, Tatvan		
 Tosunlu, Tatvan		
 Ulusoy, Tatvan		
 Uncular, Tatvan		
 Uslu, Tatvan		
 Yassıca, Tatvan		
 Yediveren, Tatvan		
 Yelkenli, Tatvan		
 Yoncabaşı, Tatvan		
 Yumrukaya, Tatvan		
 Yumurtatepe, Tatvan

References

Bitlis Province
Bitlis
List